Richard Halliwell may refer to:
 Richard Halliwell (cricketer)
 Richard Halliwell (veterinarian)
 Richard Halliwell (game designer)